Caoilfhionn Gallagher KC is an Irish-born barrister at Doughty Street Chambers in London, specialising in human rights and civil liberties.

Life
Gallagher studied at University College Dublin and graduated in 1999 with a Bachelor's degree in Civil Law. She also holds degrees from the Honorable Society of the King's Inns, Dublin; and Cambridge University.

She is one of the three joint founders of the ‘Act for the Act’ campaign (with Martha Spurrier and Fiona Bawdon), a crowdfunded advertising campaign to tell positive stories about the Human Rights Act 1998.

Gallagher led the lawyers working for the release of Ibrahim Halawa, an Irish citizen from Firhouse in South Dublin who was imprisoned in Egypt between 2013 and 2017. Halawa was adopted by Amnesty International as a prisoner of conscience and Lynn Boylan led a vote in the European parliament of 500 to 11.

Gallagher has spoken about the importance and value of pro bono work. She has represented survivors of the Hillsborough disaster and the 7/7 bombings.

In 2017 she received UCD's alumni award in Law and she became a Queen's Council in the same year. Gallagher also served as a judge that year at the Freedom of Expression Awardss with actor Noma Dumezweni, Tina Brown, Anab Jain and Stephen Budd.

In 2022 she spoke out against what she saw as anti-Irish and anti-lawyer talk made by British government ministers. She thought these were a result of Brexit. She had personally received death threats and Amnesty International supported her view that politicians should be more cautious in their accusations against lawyers and judges.

In 2023, she was appointed to the Irish independent role of Special Rapporteur-for Children. She replaces Prof Conor O’Mahony and she will serve for three years.

References

Living people
Barristers and advocates
Alumni of University College Dublin
Human rights activists
21st-century King's Counsel
Year of birth missing (living people)
People from Dublin (city)